William Rees-Davies may refer to:

 William Rees-Davies (judge) (1863–1939), British politician, lawyer and colonial judge
 William Rees-Davies (Conservative politician) (1916–1992), British Conservative politician and MP

See also
William Rees (disambiguation)
William Davies (disambiguation)
Rees Davies, Welsh historian